The Maltese skate (Leucoraja melitensis), or Maltese ray, is a species of fish in the family Rajidae. It is a rare endemic species from the Mediterranean Sea found in the coastal waters of Algeria, Italy, Malta, Tunisia, Greece and Turkey. Its natural habitat is open seas. It is threatened by habitat loss.

Sustainable consumption 
In 2010, Greenpeace International added the Maltese skate (Leucoraja melitensis) to its seafood red list. "The Greenpeace International seafood red list is a list of fish that are commonly sold in supermarkets around the world, and which have a very high risk of being sourced from unsustainable fisheries."

References

Sources 

Maltese skate
Fish of the Mediterranean Sea
Marine fauna of North Africa
Fauna of Malta
Fish of North Africa
Critically endangered fish
Critically endangered fauna of Africa
Critically endangered biota of Europe
Maltese skate
Taxonomy articles created by Polbot